Donald "Duck" Dunn (November 24, 1941 – May 13, 2012) was an American bass guitarist, session musician, record producer, and songwriter. Dunn was notable for his 1960s recordings with Booker T. & the M.G.'s and as a session bassist for Stax Records. At Stax, Dunn played on thousands of records, including hits by Otis Redding, Sam & Dave, Rufus Thomas, Carla Thomas, William Bell, Eddie Floyd, Johnnie Taylor, Albert King, Bill Withers, Elvis Presley and many others. In 1992, he was inducted in the Rock and Roll Hall of Fame as a member of Booker T. & the M.G.'s. He is ranked number 40 on Bass Player magazine's list of "The 100 Greatest Bass Players of All Time".

Early life
Dunn was born in Memphis, Tennessee. His father nicknamed him "Duck" while watching Disney cartoons with him one day. Dunn grew up playing sports and riding his bike with another future professional musician, Steve Cropper.

Career

1960s: First bands 

After Cropper began playing guitar with their friend Charlie Freeman, Dunn decided to learn to play the bass guitar. Eventually, along with drummer Terry Johnson, the four became the Royal Spades. The Messick High School group added keyboardist Jerry Lee "Smoochy" Smith, singer Ronnie Angel (also known as Stoots), and a budding young horn section in baritone saxophone player Don Nix, tenor saxophone player Charles "Packy" Axton, and trumpeter (and future co-founder of the Memphis Horns) Wayne Jackson.

Cropper has noted how the self-taught Dunn started out playing along with records, filling in what he thought should be there. "That's why Duck Dunn's bass lines are very unique," Cropper said, "They're not locked into somebody's schoolbook somewhere". Axton's mother, Estelle, and her brother Jim Stewart owned Satellite Records and signed the band, who had a national hit with "Last Night" in 1961 under their new name, the "Mar-Keys".

Booker T. and the M.G.'s was founded by Cropper and Booker T. Jones in 1962, with the drummer Al Jackson, Jr. The original bassist, on early hits such as "Green Onions", was Lewie Steinberg; Dunn replaced him in 1965.

Late 1960s–1970s: Session musician
Stax became known for Jackson's drum sound, the sound of the Memphis Horns, and Dunn's grooves. The MG's and Dunn's bass lines on songs like Otis Redding's "Respect" and "I Can't Turn You Loose", Sam & Dave's "Hold On, I'm Comin'", and Albert King's "Born Under a Bad Sign" influenced musicians everywhere.

As an instrumental group, they continued to experiment with the album McLemore Avenue (their reworking of the Beatles' Abbey Road) and on their final album, Melting Pot (1971), which featured basslines that to this day serve as a source of inspiration for hip-hop artists. In the 1970s, Jones and Cropper left Stax, but Dunn and Jackson stayed with the label. Dunn worked with Elvis Presley on his 1973 RCA Album Raised on Rock.

In 1971, when the rhythm guitarist Tom Fogerty left Creedence Clearwater Revival (CCR), the remaining members discussed with Dunn the possibility of his joining the group, with their current bassist, Stu Cook, moving to guitar.  Booker T. and the MG's had performed in concert and jammed in the studio with CCR in the past, and Dunn in particular had become friends with the band members. However, CCR ultimately decided to remain a trio from then on.

1980s–2000s

Dunn went on to play for Muddy Waters, Freddie King, Jerry Lee Lewis, Eric Clapton, Paul Butterfield, Mike Bloomfield, and Rod Stewart. He was the featured bass player on the single  "Stop Draggin' My Heart Around", by Stevie Nicks and Tom Petty, from Nicks's debut solo album Bella Donna (1981), and on other tracks by Petty between 1976 and 1981. He reunited with Cropper as a member of Levon Helm's RCO All Stars and also displayed his quirky Southern humor making two movies with Cropper, former Stax drummer Willie Hall, and Dan Aykroyd, as a member of the Blues Brothers band. Dunn was the bassist in Eric Clapton's band for Clapton's appearance at Live Aid in 1985.

Dunn played himself in the 1980 feature The Blues Brothers, where he famously uttered the line, "We had a band powerful enough to turn goat piss into gasoline!" and was frequently shown smoking a pipe while playing. He appeared in the 1998 sequel, Blues Brothers 2000, once again playing himself. Dunn & the MGs were the house band for Bob Dylan's concert celebrating Dylan's 30th anniversary in the music business at Madison Square Garden playing behind Dylan, George Harrison, Eric Clapton, Tom Petty, Stevie Wonder, Sinéad O'Connor, Eddie Vedder, and Neil Young, who recruited the MGs to tour with him and recorded with Dunn several times since.

In the 2000s, Dunn was in semi-retirement, although he still performed occasionally with Booker T. & the MG's at clubs and music festivals.

In June 2004, Dunn, Cropper, and Jones served as the house band for Eric Clapton's Crossroads Guitar Festival. The group backed such guitarists as Joe Walsh and David Hidalgo on the main stage at the Cotton Bowl in Dallas, Texas.

In 2008, Dunn worked with the Australian soul singer Guy Sebastian touring for The Memphis Album. Dunn and Cropper arrived in Australia on February 20, 2008, to be Sebastian's backing band for an 18-date concert tour, the Memphis Tour.

Dunn is credited with performing on a version of the standard "I Ain't Got Nobody" with Jones, Cropper and Michel Gondry in Gondry's 2008 film Be Kind Rewind.

Personal life
Dunn was married to his wife, June, until his death. They had two sons, Mike and Jeff, and a grandson, Michael.

Death
On the morning of May 13, 2012, Dunn died in his sleep at age 70 after finishing his fifth double show at the Blue Note nightclub in Tokyo with Cropper the night before. He had been in Japan as part of an ongoing tour with Cropper and Eddie Floyd.

Musical equipment 

When Dunn was 16, he bought his first bass guitar, a Kay 162 electric bass.  About a year later, he acquired his first Fender Precision Bass, with sunburst body, rosewood neck, and gold anodized pickguard.  He would lose this bass when Otis Redding and members of the Bar-Kays were killed in a plane crash, and the bass was on loan to bassist James Alexander.  Dunn's second Fender bass was a 1959 Fender Precision Bass, with sunburst body, one-piece maple neck and gold anodized pickguard; an instrument he owned until his death. Throughout his life, Dunn believed this was a 1958 model, but after his death, his son Jeff had work done on the bass, and the neck was inscribed "4-59," putting the date definitively as 1959. During the 1960s, he used a nearly identical 1959 model, but it was outfitted with a rosewood fretboard. He was an avid user of thick La Bella flatwound strings, as was James Jamerson.

While filming The Blues Brothers, Dunn used a sunburst early '70s Fender Precision bass with a rosewood fretboard and a "tortoiseshell" pickguard. He also used a red 1966 Precision in some of the scenes; a bass stamped "Demo" on the back, which was later fitted with a late '60s Jazz Bass neck. It was a combination that was popular with other top-level players, including Carl Radle, and Billy Cox. This "Jazzision" became the basis for a Lakland Skyline Series signature bass made by the Chicago bass company Lakland nearly 20 years later.

In 1980, with the popular Blues Brothers Band touring regularly, Fender gave Dunn a new bass to try, the company's first active electronics equipped model, the Precision Bass Special. His bass (serial number E0xx009) was finished in his favorite color, Candy Apple Red, with a matching headstock, and featured a one-piece maple neck, and gold hardware. He played this bass briefly, before gifting it to a friend.

In the mid-1980s, after nearly three decades, Dunn switched from Fender instruments, and became an endorser for Mississippi-based Peavey. He played their "Dyna Bass" model – finished in his favorite red – on stage and in the studio for a number of years. Over the decades, he was given various basses by friends and admirers, which included models by Travis Bean, Rickenbacker, Gibson, custom builders, and others, but his everyday instrument was always his Precision.

In 1998, Dunn collaborated with Fender to produce a signature Precision Bass: a candy apple red model based on the late 1950s style, with a gold anodized pickguard, split coil humbucking pickup, maple neck, and vintage hardware. The instrument never caught on with the buying public, and it was offered only for a brief time. The Dunn family has serial numbers XXX001, XXX002, and XXX003 in their collection. #002 is currently on display at the Hard Rock Cafe in Orlando, Florida.

It was fellow studio legend Bob Glaub who introduced Dunn to the people at Lakland, and based on his "Jazzision" bass from the Blues Brothers movie, the company's Duck Dunn signature model was released (later available as the model 44-64 Custom). It was on one of these basses that Duck played his final shows, and that bass remains with his son Jeff, complete with sweat streaks from his final moments of playing. In addition to those of Duck's basses that are displayed at Hard Rock Cafe locations, some are in museums (like the Rock & Roll Hall of Fame in Cleveland), and others are in the hands of private collectors.

Over the years, Dunn played through an Ampeg Portaflex, or "Fliptop", B-15 combo (so named for its head that flipped over to store in the cabinet), as well as a Kustom 200 stack, and a Fender rig. He is best known for his use of an Ampeg SVT head and the company's matching 8×10" cabinet through his endorsement deal with Ampeg.

Discography

Collaborations 
With Booker T. & the M.G.'s
 And Now! (Stax Records, 1966)
 In the Christmas Spirit (Stax Records, 1966)
 Hip Hug-Her (Stax Records, 1967)
 Doin' Our Thing (Stax Records, 1968)
 Soul Limbo (Stax Records, 1968)
 UpTight (Stax Records, 1969)
 The Booker T. Set (Stax Records, 1969)
 McLemore Avenue (Stax Records, 1970)
 Melting Pot (Stax Records, 1971)
 Universal Language (Asylum Records, 1977)
 That's the Way It Should Be (Columbia Records, 1994)

With Otis Redding
 Pain in My Heart (Atco Records, 1964)
 The Great Otis Redding Sings Soul Ballads (Atco Records, 1965)
 Otis Blue: Otis Redding Sings Soul (Stax Records, 1965)
 The Soul Album (Stax Records, 1966)
 Complete & Unbelievable: The Otis Redding Dictionary of Soul (Stax Records, 1966)
 King & Queen (Stax Records, 1967)
 The Dock of the Bay (Stax Records, 1968)

With Harry Nilsson
 Flash Harry (Mercury Records, 1980)

With John Fogerty
 Blue Moon Swamp (Warner Bros. Records, 1997)

With David Porter
 Victim of the Joke? An Opera (Enterprise Records, 1971)

With Paul Shaffer
 Coast to Coast (Capitol Records, 1989)

With Alan Gerber
 The Alan Gerber Album (Shelter Records, 1971)

With Al Kooper
 White Chocolate (Sony Records, 2008)

With Rita Coolidge
 Rita Coolidge (A&M Records, 1971)

With Delaney & Bonnie
 Home (Stax Records, 1969)

With Tinsley Ellis
 Fire It Up (Alligator Records, 1997)

With Chris Hillman
 Slippin' Away (Asylum Records, 1976)

With The Manhattan Transfer
 Pastiche (Atlantic Records, 1978)

With Crosby, Stills, Nash & Young
 Looking Forward (Reprise Records, 1999)

With Steve Cropper
 Playin' My Thang (MCA Records, 1981)

With David Blue
 Cupid's Arrow (Asylum Records, 1976)

With Mavis Staples
 Mavis Staples (Volt Records, 1969)
 Only for the Lonely (Volt Records, 1970)

With Mickey Thomas
 As Long as You Love Me (MCA Records, 1977)

With Tom Petty and the Heartbreakers
 Damn the Torpedoes (MCA Records, 1979)
 Hard Promises (Backstreet Records, 1981)

With Patti Dahlstrom
 Livin' It Thru (20th Century Records, 1976)

With Guy Sebastian
 The Memphis Album (Sony BMG, 2007)

With Doug Clifford
 Cosmo (Fantasy Records, 1972)

With Eric Clapton
 Money and Cigarettes (Warner Bros. Records, 1983)
 Behind the Sun (Warner Bros. Records, 1985)

With Leo Sayer
 Here (Chrysalis Records, 1979)

With Levon Helm
 Levon Helm & the RCO All-Stars (ABC Records, 1977)

With Joan Baez
 Gulf Winds (A&M Records, 1976)
 Blowin' Away (Portrait Records, 1977)

With Bill Withers
 Just as I Am (Sussex Records, 1971)

With Billy Swan
 You're OK, I'm OK (A&M Records, 1978)

With Albert King
 Born Under a Bad Sign (Stax Records, 1967)
 Years Gone By (Stax Records, 1969)
 Blues for Elvis – King Does the King's Things (Stax Records, 1970)
 Lovejoy (Stax Records, 1971)
 The Blues Don't Change (Stax Records, 1974)

With Tony Joe White
 Lake Placid Blues (Polydor Records, 1995)

With Stevie Nicks
 Bella Donna (Atco Records, 1981)

With William Bell
 The Soul of a Bell (Stax Records, 1967)
 Bound to Happen (Stax Records, 1969)
 Relating (Stax Records, 1974)

With Freddie King
 Getting Ready (Shelter Records, 1971)
 Texas Cannonball (Shelter Records, 1972)

With Joe Dassin
 Blue Country (CBS, 1979)

With Bob Dylan
 Shot of Love (Columbia Records, 1981)

With Muddy Waters
 Fathers and Sons (Chess Records, 1969)

With John Prine
 Common Sense (Atlantic Records, 1975)

With Eddie Floyd
 Knock on Wood (Stax Records, 1967)
 Soul Street (Stax Records, 1974)

With Richie Havens
 The End of the Beginning (A&M Records, 1976)

With Neil Young
 Silver & Gold (Reprise Records, 2000)
 Are You Passionate? (Reprise Records, 2002)

With Rod Stewart
 Atlantic Crossing (Warner Bros. Records, 1975)
 A Night on the Town (Warner Bros. Records, 1976)

With Peter Frampton
 Where I Should Be (A&M Records, 1979)

With Carla Thomas
 Memphis Queen (Stax Records, 1969)
 Love Means... (Stax Records, 1971)

With Wilson Pickett
 In the Midnight Hour (Atlantic Records, 1965)
 The Exciting Wilson Pickett (Atlantic Records, 1966)

With Jimmy Buffett
 Hot Water (MCA Records, 1988)

With Shirley Brown
 Woman to Woman (Truth Records, 1974)
 Shirley Brown (Arista Records, 1977)

With Leon Russell
 Will O' the Wisp (Shelter Records, 1975)

Awards
In 1992, Dunn was inducted into the Rock and Roll Hall of Fame as a member of Booker T. & the MG's.

In 2007 Dunn and members of Booker T. & the MG's (Booker T. Jones, Steve Cropper and Lewie Steinberg), along with Barbara Jackson, the widow of Al Jackson, Jr., were given a Lifetime Achievement Grammy award for their contributions to popular music.

In 2017 Dunn was posthumously awarded a Lifetime Achievement Award by Bass Player Magazine for his contributions to "the art, craft, and profession of bass playing."

References

Bibliography

External links
Official website

1941 births
2012 deaths
American rock bass guitarists
American male bass guitarists
American male film actors
American rhythm and blues bass guitarists
American session musicians
Record producers from Tennessee
Songwriters from Tennessee
Guitarists from Tennessee
Musicians from Memphis, Tennessee
Booker T. & the M.G.'s members
Stax Records artists
The Blues Brothers members
20th-century American bass guitarists